The Myer family is an Australian retailing dynasty with jewish origin. It was founded in Australia by Sidney Myer, who started the department store Myer, and Merlyn Myer, his wife. Following the death of Sidney Myer in 1934, his nephew, Sir Norman Myer, continued much of his retailing dynasty. The family has a strong history of philanthropy and established one of Australia's first single family offices in 1976.

Biographies
The Australian Dictionary of Biography has articles on the following members of the Myer family:
 Sidney Myer
 Dame Merlyn Myer
 Sir Norman Myer

Family tree

Ezekiel Baevski m. Koona Dubrusha née Shur
Yacov Meer Baevski (2 May 1928  – 1899), m. Chaya née Sitz
Sir Norman Myer (born Nahum Moshe Baevski; 25 May 1897  – 17 December 1956) m. (1) Gladys Margaret née Roche, divorced in 1951.
Pamela Myer m. Simon Warrender  (11 August 1922 – 8 May 2011), a businessman and former Royal Navy officer, the son of Victor Warrender, 1st Baron Bruntisfield. Myer and Warrender divorced in 1986.

Sir Norman Myer (born Nahum Moshe Baevski; 25 May 1897  – 17 December 1956) m. (2) Pamela Margaret née Sallmann.

Elcon Myer (born Elcon Baevski; 4 December 1875  – 18 February 1938) m. Rose née Marks (  – 4 August 1927), later divorced.
Sidney Myer (born Simcha Myer Baevski; 8 February 1878 – 5 September 1934) m. (1) Hannah Nance née Flegeltaub (1868–1963) on 8 March 1905; divorced.
Sidney Myer (8 February 1878 – 5 September 1934) m. (2) Merlyn née Baillieu  (8 January 1900 – 3 September 1982)
Ken Myer  (1 March 1921 – 30 July 1992) m. Prudence née Boyd in 1947, divorced 1976.
Joanna Baevski
Michael Myer
Philip Myer
Martyn Myer, a Coles Myer director since 1996.
Andrew Myer
Ken Myer  m. Yasuko née Hiraoka (16 March 1945 – 30 July 1992). Ken is a co-founder of the Myer Foundation. Ken and Yasuko Myer were killed in a light aircraft crash in Alaska on 30 July 1992. 
Neilma (7 November 1922 – 15 June 2015) m. Vallejo Gantner (1911–1996) on 8 August 1941 in Toorak, Melbourne, and later divorced. Neilma is a co-founder of The Gantner Myer Collection of Australian Aboriginal Art, which was assembled over a four-year period by curator Jennifer Isaacs. The collection was unveiled in San Francisco in September 1999.  Neilma Gantner was a member of the Executive of International Social Service, and of the Myer Foundation and the Sidney Myer Fund. She worked as a novelist, poet and short story writer under the pseudonym of Neilma Sidney, and founded the Four Winds Cultural Festival (Bermagui, New South Wales). In 2017 Writers Victoria announced the first recipients for the Neilma Sidney Literary Travel Fund, named in her memory. 
Carrillo Gantner, a co-founder of The Gantner Myer Collection of Australian Aboriginal Art
Vallejo Gantner Jnr (  – 1962) at the age of 19. Along with her son Carillo and brother Baillieu Myer, she established 
Sidney Baillieu Myer  (Bails) (11 January 1926 – 22 January 2022) m. Sarah née Hordern. Sidney Baillieu Myer was a co-founder and past president of the Myer Foundation. He was a Trustee of the Sidney Myer Fund from 1958 to 2001 and chairman from 1992 to 2001. He was chairman of The Myer Emporium Limited, president of the Howard Florey Institute and Executive Member of the CSIRO. His career has spanned the fields of business, medical research, aged care, Australia-Asian relations, the arts, conservation, education and rural communities. His commitments and appointments include: Patron of Asialink, Patron of the Foundation for Rural & Regional Renewal, Trustee Emeritus, National Gallery of Victoria, Director of the Howard Florey Institute, 1971–2002, and President, 1988–1992, chairman, The Myer Emporium Limited, 1978–1986, Executive Member, CSIRO, 1981–1985. He was made an Honorary Doctor of Law, University of Melbourne, in 1993.
Sid Myer
Samantha Myer
Rupert Hordern Myer  (13 August 1958  – ), currently the chair, Australia Council for the Arts, since 2012, and a Deputy Chairman of Myer Holdings Limited. 
Marigold Merlyn Baillieu Myer  m. (1) Ross Shelmerdine (  – 1979) in 1950.

Tom Shelmerdine
Stephen Shelmerdine , a winemaker
Marigold Merlyn Shelmerdine (Lady Southey)  m. (2) Sir Robert Southey ( - 1998) on 22 July 1982. Lady Southey has a longstanding service to the community in the support of health care, medical research and the arts. She was Lieutenant-Governor of Victoria 2001–2006; and served as president of Philanthropy Australia between 2000 and 2006; and the St Catherine's School Foundation. She resigned as president of the Myer Foundation in 2004. Lady Southey is a supporter and Honorary Life Member of the Australian Ballet, Life Member of the Nuffield Farming Scholars Association, and a supporter of Birds Australia.

References

Myer family